Turkey competed at the 2000 Summer Olympics in Sydney, Australia.

Medalists

Results by event

Archery

In its fifth Olympic archery competition, Turkey again came within one victory of a medal.  The women's team again made it to the semifinal before losing there.  In the bronze medal match, they were defeated by Germany to eliminate them from medal contention.

Women's Team Competition:
 Altankaynak, Keskin Şatır, Nasaridze – bronze medal match, 4th place (2-2)

Men's Team Competition:
 Orbay, Satir, and Akbal – quarterfinal, 5th place (1-1)

Athletics

Men's competition
Men's Long Jump
 Mesut Yavaş
 Qualifying – 7.35 m (did not advance)

Men's Pole Vault
 Ruhan Işım
 Qualifying – DNS

Women's competition
Women's 1,500m
 Süreyya Ayhan
 Round 1 – 04:08.37
 Semifinal – 04:09.42 (did not advance)

Women's 5,000m
 Ebru Kavaklıoğlu
 Round 1 – 15:49.15 (did not advance)

Women's Discus
 Oksana Mert
 Qualifying – 55.02 m (did not advance)

Women's Marathon
 Serap Aktaş
 Final – 2:42:40 (37th place)

Boxing
Men's Light Flyweight (– 48 kg)
Ramazan Ballıoğlu
Round 1 – Lost to Marian Velicu of Romania (→ did not advance)

Men's Flyweight (– 51 kg)
Halil İbrahim Turan
Round 1 – Lost to Hicham Mesbahi of Morocco (→ did not advance)

Men's Bantamweight (– 54 kg)
Agasi Agaguloglu
Round 1 – Defeated Kangde Mai of China
Round 2 – Defeated Cermeno Nehomar of Venezuela
Quarterfinal – Lost to Guillermo Rigondeaux of Cuba (→ did not advance)

Men's Featherweight (– 57 kg)
Ramazan Palyani
Round 1 – Defeated Ali Haider of Pakistan
Round 2 – Defeated Vlademir Dos Santos Pereira of Brazil
Quarterfinal – Lost to Bekzat Sattarkhanov of Kazakhstan (→ did not advance)

Men's Lightweight (– 60 kg)
Selim Palyani
Round 1 – Defeated Abdel Jebahi of France
Round 2 – Defeated David Jackson of United States
Quarterfinal – Lost to Alexandr Maletin of Russia (→ did not advance)

Men's Light Welterweight (– 63.5 kg)
Nurhan Süleymanoğlu
Round 1 – Defeated Michael Strange of Canada
Round 2 – Lost to Sergey Bykovsky of Belarus (→ did not advance)

Men's Welterweight (– 67 kg)
Bülent Ulusoy
Round 1 – Defeated Jin-Suk Bae of Korea
Round 2 – Defeated Dante Craig of United States
Quarterfinal – Lost to Vitalie Gruşac of Moldova (→ did not advance)

Men's Light Middleweight (– 71 kg)
Fırat Karagöllü
Round 1 – Defeated Michael Roche of Ireland
Round 2 – Lost to Frédéric Esther of France (→ did not advance)

Men's Middleweight (– 75 kg)
Akın Kuloğlu
Round 1 – Defeated Mariano Natalio Carrera of Argentina
Round 2 – Defeated Im Jung-Bin of Korea
Quarterfinal – Lost to Vugar Alekperov of Azerbaijan (→ did not advance)

Sailing
Men's Mistral
 Ertuğrul İçingir
 Race 1 – 26 
 Race 2 – (37) OCS
 Race 3 – 24 
 Race 4 – 11 
 Race 5 – 15 
 Race 6 – 28 
 Race 7 – 29 
 Race 8 – 25 
 Race 9 – (37) OCS 
 Race 10 – 22 
 Race 11 – 37 DSQ
 Final – 217 (31st place)

Men's Single Handed Dinghy (Finn)
 Ali Enver Adakan
 Race 1 – 5 
 Race 2 – 7 
 Race 3 – (17)
 Race 4 – 7 
 Race 5 – 9 
 Race 6 – (23)
 Race 7 – 11 
 Race 8 – 3 
 Race 9 – 4 
 Race 10 – 7 
 Race 11 – 13 
 Final – 66 (8th place)

Women's Mistral
 İlknur Akdoğan
 Race 1 – (30) DNF
 Race 2 – 27 
 Race 3 – (28)
 Race 4 – 28 
 Race 5 – 26 
 Race 6 – 25 
 Race 7 – 28 
 Race 8 – 28 
 Race 9 – 27 
 Race 10 – 28 
 Race 11 – 24 
 Final – 241 (28th place)

Open Laser
 Ali Kemal Tüfekçi
 Race 2 – (40)
 Race 3 – 33 
 Race 4 – (37)
 Race 5 – 29 
 Race 6 – 28 
 Race 7 – 36 
 Race 8 – 30 
 Race 9 – 14 
 Race 10 – 24 
 Race 11 – 27 
 Final – 254 (34th place)

Swimming

Men's 200 m Freestyle
 Aytekin Mindan
 Preliminary Heat – 1:54.86 (did not advance)

Men's 400 m Freestyle
 Aytekin Mindan
 Preliminary Heat – 04:01.46 (did not advance)

Men's 100 m Breaststroke
 Hakan Kiper
 Preliminary Heat – 01:07.46 (did not advance)

Men's 100 m Backstroke
 Derya Büyükuncu
 Preliminary Heat – 56.21 (did not advance)

Men's 200 m Individual Medley
 Orel Oral
 Preliminary Heat – 02:09.51 (did not advance)

Women's 100 m Butterfly
 Ayse Diker
 Preliminary Heat – 01:04.65 (did not advance)

Women's 100 m Breaststroke
 İlkay Dikmen
 Preliminary Heat – 01:11.51 (did not advance)

Women's 200 m Breaststroke
 İlkay Dikmen
 Preliminary Heat – 02:33.34 (did not advance)

Women's 100 m Backstroke
 Derya Erke
 Preliminary Heat – 01:07.26 (did not advance)

Women's 200 m Backstroke
 Derya Erke
 Preliminary Heat – 02:21.28 (did not advance)

Weightlifting

Men

References

Wallechinsky, David (2004). The Complete Book of the Summer Olympics (Athens 2004 Edition). Toronto, Canada. . 
International Olympic Committee (2001). The Results. Retrieved 12 November 2005.
Sydney Organising Committee for the Olympic Games (2001). Official Report of the XXVII Olympiad Volume 1: Preparing for the Games. Retrieved 20 November 2005.
Sydney Organising Committee for the Olympic Games (2001). Official Report of the XXVII Olympiad Volume 2: Celebrating the Games. Retrieved 20 November 2005.
Sydney Organising Committee for the Olympic Games (2001). The Results. Retrieved 20 November 2005.
International Olympic Committee Web Site

Nations at the 2000 Summer Olympics
2000 Summer Olympics
Olympics